Breynat may refer to:

Breynat, Alberta, a hamlet in Alberta, Canada
Breynat River, a tributary of the Harricana River, in Nord-du-Québec, Canada
Breynat Lake, one of the sources of the Breynat River